Trephionus cylindriphallus, is a species of beetle belonging to the family Carabidae. It is endemic to Japan.

Etymology
The specific name cylindriphallus is due to cylindrical shape of the endophallus.

Description
Body length of male is about 8.9–9.8 mm, whereas female is 8.2–10.0 mm. Dorsal surface blackish brown to black. Endophallus cylindrical in shape. No hind wings. Dorso-apical lobe semi-ellipsoid. Apex of aedeagus rounded.

References

Beetles described in 2018
Platyninae